Ridge Spring is a town in Saluda County, South Carolina, United States. The population was 737 at the 2010 census. It is part of the Columbia, SC Metropolitan Statistical Area. The Mayor-Elect is Ms. Qwendolyn Etheredge.

History
Ridge Hill High School was added to the National Register of Historic Places in 2010.

Geography
Ridge Spring is located at  (33.845942, -81.660845).

Demographics

As of the census of 2000, 823 people, 321 households, and 217 families resided in the town. The 368 housing units averaged . The racial makeup of the town was 33.90% White, 63.91% Black, 0.12% Native American, 0.61% from other races, and 1.46% from two or more races. Hispanics or Latinos of any race were 2.55% of the population.

Of the 321 households, 26.2% had children under the age of 18 living with them, 40.5% were married couples living together, 22.4% had a female householder with no husband present, and 32.1% were not families. About 28.0% of all households were made up of individuals, and 15.9% had someone living alone who was 65 years of age or older. The average household size was 2.56 and the average family size was 3.18.

In the town, the population was distributed as 24.4% under the age of 18, 9.7% from 18 to 24, 23.5% from 25 to 44, 23.7% from 45 to 64, and 18.7% who were 65 years of age or older. The median age was 40 years. For every 100 females, there were 81.3 males. For every 100 females age 18 and over, there were 80.3 males.

The median income for a household in the town was $25,982, and for a family was $28,984. Males had a median income of $30,476 versus $20,208 for females. The per capita income for the town was $12,083. About 23.4% of families and 26.6% of the population were below the poverty line, including 39.2% of those under age 18 and 16.0% of those age 65 or over.

Education
Ridge Spring has a public library, a branch of the Saluda County Library.

References

External links
 Town of Ridge Spring

Towns in Saluda County, South Carolina